María del Carmen Martín (born 1 September 1976) is a Spanish field hockey player who competed in the 2000 Summer Olympics and in the 2004 Summer Olympics.

References

External links
 

1976 births
Living people
Spanish female field hockey players
Olympic field hockey players of Spain
Field hockey players at the 2000 Summer Olympics
Field hockey players at the 2004 Summer Olympics